Belarus made its Paralympic Games début at the 1994 Winter Paralympics in Lillehammer. It has participated in every subsequent edition of both the Summer and Winter Paralympics.

Belarusian athletes have won a total of 98 Paralympic medals, of which 27 gold, 37 silver and 34 bronze, placing it 33rd on the all-time Paralympic Games medal table. 78 of Belarus's medals were won at the Summer Paralympics.

Belarus's largest medal haul came at the 2004 Summer Games, with a total of 29, of which 10 gold.

In 2022, in response to the country's participation in the Russian invasion of Ukraine, as well its treatment of Belarusian athletes, Belarus was suspended from the Paralympic Games. On 2 March 2022, the IPC originally declared that Belarusian athletes would be able to compete as neutral athletes under the designation Paralympic Neutral Athletes, however their decision was reversed the following day and the athletes were banned from competing.

Medal tallies

Summer Paralympics

Medals by Winter Games

Medalists

Summer Paralympics

Winter Paralympics

See also
 Belarus at the Olympics

References

 
Paralympics